World cup of rugby may refer to:

Rugby league 
 Rugby League World Cup
 Women's Rugby League World Cup
 Wheelchair Rugby League World Cup
 The World Cup in physical disability rugby league
 Rugby League World Cup 9s

Rugby union 
 Rugby World Cup (Men)
 Rugby World Cup (women) (Women)
 Rugby World Cup Sevens